The policy of Russification of Finland was a governmental policy of the Russian Empire aimed at limiting the special status of the Grand Duchy of Finland and possibly the termination of its political autonomy and cultural uniqueness in 1899–1905 and in 1908–1917. It was a part of a larger policy of Russification pursued by late 19th–early 20th century Russian governments which tried to abolish cultural and administrative autonomy of non-Russian minorities within the empire.

The two Russification campaigns evoked widespread Finnish resistance, starting with petitions and escalating to strikes, passive resistance (including draft resistance) and eventually active resistance. Finnish opposition to Russification was one of the main factors that ultimately led to Finland's declaration of independence in 1917.

Under Tsarist Russia 
Russia attacked Sweden in 1808, in what became later known as the Finnish War. In 1809 the lost territory of Sweden became the Grand Duchy of Finland in the Russian Empire. In 1809 the Diet of Finland recognized Alexander I of Russia as grand duke. For his part, Alexander confirmed the rights of the Finns, in particular, promising freedom to pursue their customs and religion and to maintain their identity:

First period of Russification 
This promise was maintained; indeed, Alexander II amplified the powers of the Finnish diet in 1869. Having enjoyed prosperity and control over their own affairs, and having remained loyal subjects for nearly a century, the manifesto which Nicholas II issued on 15 February 1899 was cause for Finnish despair. The manifesto was forced through the Finnish senate by the deciding vote of the senate president, an appointee of the tsar—and after the governor-general of Finland, Nikolay Bobrikov, had threatened a military invasion and siege. While ostensibly affirming the Finns' rights in purely local matters, the manifesto asserted the authority of the state in any and all matters which could be considered to "come within the scope of the general legislation of the empire".

As a response to the manifesto, a petition with 523,000 names was gathered and a delegation of 500 people were sent to deliver it to the tsar. A separate petition called Pro Finlandia that contained the names of 1,050 prominent foreign people was also gathered few months later.

Russification policies enacted included:
 The above-mentioned February Manifesto of 1899, the decree by Emperor Nicholas II which asserted the imperial government's right to rule Finland without the consent of local legislative bodies, under which:
 the Orthodox Russian Church's status was strengthened; including, for example, criminalizing the act of subjecting a follower of the Orthodox church to a Lutheran church service;
 the press was subjected to tighter Russian censorship than before;
 the Finnish army was made subject to Russian rules of military service.
 The Language Manifesto of 1900, a decree by Nicholas II which made Russian the language of administration of Finland (in 1900, there were an estimated 8,000 Russians in all of Finland, of a population of 2,700,000)—the Finns saw this as placing the Russian minority in charge.
 The conscription law, signed by Nicholas II in July 1901 incorporating the Finnish army into the imperial army and forcing Finns to serve in Russian units.
 Finnish stamps were abolished and Russian stamps became the only ones allowed in January 1901.
 Some Finnish government offices, such as the Railway and Lighthouse Boards got new, Russian, staff.

From April 1903 until the Russian Revolution of 1905, the governor-general was granted dictatorial powers. Bobrikov used these powers to personally abolish several newspapers and to deport notable Finnish political leaders. In June 1904 Eugen Schauman assassinated Bobrikov. The imperial government responded with a purge of opponents of Russification within the Finnish administration and more stringent censorship. However the passive resistance campaign also had some successes, notably a de facto reversal of the new conscription law.

The Russification campaign was suspended and partially reversed in 1905–1907 during a period of civil unrest throughout the Russian empire following Russian defeats in the Russo-Japanese War.

Second period of Russification 
The program was reintroduced in 1908, costing Finland much of its autonomy and again causing further Finnish resistance, including the Jäger movement. During 1909–1917 the Finnish politicians in the Senate of Finland were replaced by Finnish-born officers of the Russian army who were formally subjects of the Grand Duchy, creating the so-called admiral-senate or saber-senate. The 1910 "Law of all-Empire legislation procedures" removed most Finnish legislative powers from the newly established Finnish Parliament to the Russian Duma and State Council. In 1912 they passed the "Law of equality" which opened all Finnish government and civil service offices to Russians.

Many measures were again suspended in 1914–1917 during the First World War, but secret government documents published in the Finnish press in November 1914 suggested that the imperial government still harbored plans for the complete Russification of Finland.

The second wave halted due to the February Revolution in Russia.

Japanese involvement
During the Russo-Japanese War, with financial aid from Japan the rebels bought a shipment of thousands of rifles with the aim of creating an uprising and forming an independent state. However, the ship was wrecked off the coast of Finland and the plan fell apart. During the First World War when Russia and Japan were allies fighting against Germany, the Japanese handed the Russian government a list of the leading men in the freedom movement (now in World War I working with Imperial Germany).

See also
 Russification
 Kagal (Finnish society)
 Russophobia
 Russification of Belarus
 Russification of Ukraine

Notes

References

Further reading
 Sergeevskii, N. D. Finland : the question of autonomy and fundamental laws (1911)
 Alenius, Kari. "Russification in Estonia and Finland Before 1917," Faravid, 2004, Vol. 28, pp 181–194
 Huxley, Steven. Constitutionalist insurgency in Finland: Finnish "passive resistance" against Russification as a case of nonmilitary struggle in the European resistance tradition (1990)
 Polvinen, Tuomo. Imperial Borderland: Bobrikov and the Attempted Russification of Finland, 1898–1904 (1995)
 Thaden, Edward C. Russification in the Baltic Provinces and Finland (1981).

External links
 The Era of Russification
 "The Gracious Manifesto of the Imperial Majesty", text of the February Manifesto of 1899 (in English)
 Nicholas's Decree Limiting Finnish Autonomy, March 20, 1903 (in English)

Grand Duchy of Finland
Russification